Bartosz Jan Cichocki (born 12 August 1976, Warsaw) is a Polish political scientist and historian, since 2019 serving as an ambassador to Ukraine.

Life 
Cichocki graduated from history at the University of Warsaw. He worked for the KARTA Center, Centre for Eastern Studies as an analyst on Russian regional policy, Polish Institute of International Affairs as a coordination of Russia-Eurasia programme, National Security Bureau as a specialist on Russian foreign and security policies, and head of international relations unit. Between 2015 and 2016 he was at the Polish embassy in Moscow. In 2017, he was an advisor to the head of the Foreign Intelligence Agency. On 25 May 2017, Cichocki joined the Ministry of Foreign Affairs, becoming Undersecretary of State for security, Eastern and European policy. Since 1 February 2018 the prime minister Mateusz Morawiecki made him Head of the Polish Group for Legal and Historical Dialogue with Israel.

On 8 March 2019, he was nominated Polish ambassador to Ukraine, 8 days later presenting his letter of credence to the President Petro Poroshenko. In February 2022, he was the only EU ambassador who did not leave Kyiv during the siege.

Honours 

 2022 – Order of Merit, 2nd class, Ukraine

References 

1976 births
21st-century Polish politicians
Ambassadors of Poland to Ukraine
Diplomats from Warsaw
21st-century Polish historians
Polish male non-fiction writers
Polish political scientists
Recipients of the Order of Merit (Ukraine), 2nd class
University of Warsaw alumni
Living people